Eadgyth (died 946) was a princess and wife of Holy Roman Emperor Otto I, Holy Roman Emperor.

Eadgyth may also refer to:

 Eadgyth of Polesworth (fl. early 10th century), thought to be a sister of King Æthelstan and wife to Sihtric Cáech
 Eadgyth of Wilton (died c. 984), saint, and daughter of Edgar the Peaceful of England
 Eadgyth (fl. 10–11th century), daughter of King Æthelred the Unready by his first wife Ælfgifu of York and spouse to Eadric Streona

See also

 
 Edith